Henry Mills Fuller (January 3, 1820 – December 26, 1860) was a Whig and Opposition Party member of the U.S. House of Representatives from Pennsylvania.

Biography
Henry M. Fuller was born in Bethany, Pennsylvania.  He graduated from Princeton College in 1839.  He studied law, was admitted to the bar January 3, 1842, and commenced practice in Wilkes-Barre, Pennsylvania.  He was a member of the Pennsylvania House of Representatives in 1848 and 1849.

Fuller was elected as a Whig to the Thirty-second Congress.  He was an unsuccessful candidate for reelection in 1852.  He was reelected as an Opposition Party candidate to the Thirty-fourth Congress.  He was not a candidate for renomination in 1856.  He resumed the practice of law, and died in Philadelphia in 1860.  Interment in Hollenback Cemetery in Wilkes-Barre, Pennsylvania.

Sources

The Political Graveyard

1820 births
1860 deaths
People from Wayne County, Pennsylvania
Whig Party members of the United States House of Representatives from Pennsylvania
Opposition Party members of the United States House of Representatives from Pennsylvania
Members of the Pennsylvania House of Representatives
Pennsylvania lawyers
Politicians from Wilkes-Barre, Pennsylvania
Princeton University alumni
19th-century American politicians
19th-century American lawyers